Chandler (also known as Open Shadow) is a 1971 American neo-noir film directed by Paul Magwood and based on a story of his own creation. The film stars Warren Oates as a man with the single name of Chandler: "as in Raymond," he says at one point. It co-stars Leslie Caron, married at the time to the film's producer Michael Laughlin. Cameo roles feature Gloria Grahame and Scatman Crothers.

Plot
In a deliberate throwback to 1940s films noir, Chandler, a former private eye from that period, takes up his old work again, and finds himself constantly driving old cars. He is ostensibly hired by the government to protect a witness, Katherine Creighton, from a gangland leader, John Melchior, who wants to kill her. But Chandler is in fact working for a corrupt government agent, Ross J. Carmady, who is using him as a dupe so that Carmady can murder Melchior and put his own double agent at the top of the racket.

After quitting a position as a security guard, Chandler is offered a job by old friend Bernie Oakman, unaware that Bernie has been asked by Carmady to find a suitable patsy. Chandler gets his gun back from a pawn shop and follows the French woman Creighton from the moment of her arrival in Los Angeles. He becomes acquainted with her on a train to Monterey, California without revealing that he is tailing her, but soon intervenes when Creighton is assaulted and thrown into the trunk of a car.

Chandler becomes romantically involved with the woman, against his better judgment, repeatedly telling her, "You'll do." The two of them end up trapped near an isolated beach, ambushed by Carmady and his associate Kincaid, shooting it out.

Cast

 Warren Oates as Chandler
 Leslie Caron as Katherine Creighton
 Alex Dreier as Ross J. Carmady
 Marianne McAndrew as Angel Carter
 Mitch Ryan as Charles "Chuck" Kincaid
 Gordon Pinsent as John Melchior
 Charles McGraw as Bernie Oakman
 Walter Burke as Zeno
 Richard Loo as Leo 
 Gloria Grahame as Selma
 Scatman Crothers as Smoke

Production
The scene on the train begins with an incorrect establishing shot. The train shown is a Chicago, Burlington and Quincy Railroad passenger train, which never operated in California.

Scenes on board the passenger train feature people purchasing food from vending machines in a Southern Pacific Automat Buffet car.

Producer Michael Laughlin and director Paul Magwood were irate at the involvement of MGM studio head James Thomas Aubrey, Jr. in the film's production. They went to the length of taking out a full page, black-bordered ad in the trade papers declaring:
Regarding what was our film Chandler, let's give credit where credit is due. We sadly acknowledge that all editing, post-production as well as additional scenes were executed by James T. Aubrey Jr. We are sorry.

The cutting was so severe and last minute that actors Royal Dano and James Sikking are still listed in the credits, even though their roles were completely removed.

See also
 List of American films of 1971
 List of film noir titles

References

External links
 
 
 
 

1971 films
Films set in Los Angeles
American mystery films
Metro-Goldwyn-Mayer films
Films produced by Michael Laughlin
American detective films
American neo-noir films
1970s English-language films
1970s American films